Tade Thompson is a British-born Nigerian psychiatrist best known for his science fiction novels.

Life and career
Thompson was born in London to Yoruba parents. His family left the United Kingdom for Nigeria in 1976, when Thompson was seven.  He grew up in Nigeria, where he studied medicine and social anthropology. He went on to specialise in psychiatry. He returned to the UK in 1998, where he has remained except for a year spent working in Samoa. He now lives on the south coast of England.

His novels and short stories have been critically well received. Thompson is a Nommo Award and a Kitschies Golden Tentacle Award winner. He is a John W. Campbell Award finalist as well as nominated for the Shirley Jackson Award, the British Science Fiction Award, and the Nommo Award. Thompson is also an illustrator and artist. His novella The Murders of Molly Southbourne has been optioned for screen adaptation.

His novel Rosewater, the first book in the Wormwood trilogy set in Nigeria won the Arthur C. Clarke award in 2019.

Bibliography

Novels

The Wormwood Trilogy
  (revised version 2018)

Stand-alone

Novellas and short fiction

The Molly Southbourne Trilogy 
The Murders of Molly Southbourne (2017)
The Survival of Molly Southbourne (2019)
The Legacy of Molly Southbourne (2022)

Stand-alone 
"The McMahon Institute for Unquiet Minds" (2005)
"Slip Road" (2009)
"Shadow" (2010)
"Notes from Gethsemane" (2012)
"Bicycle Girl" (2013)
"One Hundred and Twenty Days of Sunlight" (2013)
"Slip Road" (revised) (2014)
"Budo or, The Flying Orchid" (2014)
"The Monkey House" (2015)
"Child, Funeral, Thief, Death" (2015)
"The Last Pantheon" (2015) (with Nick Wood)
"Decommissioned" (2016)
"Household Gods" (2016)
"The Apologists" (2016)
"Gnaw" (2016)
"Bootblack" (2017)
"Yard Dog" (2018)
"Jackdaw" (2022)

Poems 
"Komolafe" (2013)

Essays 
 The Last Word on the Last Pantheon (2016) (with Nick Wood)
 Please Stop Talking about the 'Rise' of African Science Fiction (2018)

Other work
 Omenana Magazine #4 (September 2015) (cover art) 
 In Morningstar's Shadow: Dominion of the Fallen Stories by Aliette de Bodard (2015) (cover art)

References

External links
 
 

Living people
Nigerian artists
English science fiction writers
English psychologists
21st-century Nigerian novelists
Nigerian science fiction writers
Nigerian male novelists
Yoruba novelists
English people of Yoruba descent
Year of birth missing (living people)
English male novelists
Yoruba diaspora
Nigerian psychiatrists
Yoruba physicians
Black speculative fiction authors
Black British writers
Nommo Award winners